The Sanjak of Kavala (Ottoman Turkish: Sancak-i/Liva-i Kavala) was a second-level Ottoman province (sanjak or liva) encompassing the region around the port town of Kavala (now in Greece) in eastern Macedonia.

History
The town probably fell into Ottoman hands ca. 1383, shortly after the fall of Serres. In the 15th century, the region of Kavala was known for its cereal and silk production, but chiefly for its silver mines.

The sanjak is attested by Leunclavius in 1588, and again in the seventh volume of Evliya Çelebi's travel books as a province of the Eyalet of the Archipelago, but in the fifth volume of the same work simply as a captaincy of the Sanjak of Gallipoli. At the time of Evliya Çelebi's visit, it comprised 12 ziamets and 235 timars and was subdivided into seven kazas.

In the 18th century and the first half of the 19th century, Drama was a sanjak of the Rumeli Eyalet; its revenue was usually granted to the pasha of Salonica, who governed the sanjak through a fiscal agent (mütesellim). With the administrative reforms of 1864, the sanjak was abolished and incorporated in the Sanjak of Drama, part of the Salonica Vilayet. Drama remained the centre of a kaza in the new province.

See also
 Kavala (regional unit)

References

Sources
 
 

Macedonia under the Ottoman Empire
Kavala
Kavala
History of Kavala
States and territories disestablished in the 1860s
1860s disestablishments in the Ottoman Empire